Slice may refer to:
Cutting

Food and beverage
A portion of bread, pizza, cake, or meat that is cut flat and thin:
Sliced bread
Pizza by the slice, a fast food dish
Slice (drink), a line of fruit-flavored soft drinks

In Australia and New Zealand 
A category of sweet or savory dishes:
Vanilla slice, a dessert cake similar to a brownie
Zucchini slice, a savory dish similar to a quiche

In arts and entertainment

Music
Slice (album), a Five for Fighting album, 2009
"Slice" (song), a 2009 song by Five for Fighting
Slice, a 1998 album by Arthur Loves Plastic
 Slices (band)

Other uses in arts and entertainment
Slice (TV channel), a Canadian TV channel formerly known as Life Network
Slice (film), 2018 film
Slice (G.I. Joe), a fictional character in the G.I. Joe universe
Slice, a region in Terry Pratchett's Discworld stories, see Discworld (world)#The Ramtops
Slice, in lieu of "chapter", in Norman Lindsay's children's book The Magic Pudding

In mathematics, science, and technology

Computing
Time slice, the time during which a process runs
Time slice multiplexing, a form of processor scheduling
Slice (disk), a logical division or partition of a hard disk
Array slicing, an operation that extracts certain elements from an array
Bit slicing, a technique for constructing a processor from modules of smaller bit width
Specification Language for Ice, Internet Communications Engine

Mathematics
Slice category, in category theory, a special case of a comma category
Slice genus, in knot theory
Slice knot, in knot theory
Slice sampling, a Monte Carlo sampling method
Projection-slice theorem, a theorem about Fourier transforms
Bers slice in theory of Kleinian groups

Other uses in science and technology
Slice preparation or brain slice, an in vitro technique for neurophysiology
Slice (electronics), a wafer of semiconductor material used in circuits

Sports
Backspin, in racquet sports or golf; also known as "slice" in racquet sports
Golf slice, or "slice", a golf shot in which the ball curves sideways in flight due to sidespin, usually unintentionally, as a result of a mishit
Kimbo Slice (1974–2016), a mixed-martial arts fighter
Barry "Slice" Rohrssen (1960–), an American basketball coach

Business and other uses
Slice, Inc., a company that designs and produces box cutters and other cutting tools
Rakuten Slice, a company that measures digital commerce and provides online shopping services
Slice (app), an online food ordering platform for independent pizzerias

See also
 
 
 Slicing (disambiguation)
 Splice (disambiguation)
 Part (disambiguation)